Sarab-e Garm-e Sofla (also Romanized as Sarāb-e Garm-e Soflá; also known as Sarāb-e Garm, Sarāb Garm, and Sarābgarm) is a village in Howmeh-ye Sarpol Rural District, in the Central District of Sarpol-e Zahab County, Kermanshah Province, Iran. At the 2006 census, its population was 40, in 8 families.

References 

Populated places in Sarpol-e Zahab County